Simen Chapari College, established in 1994, is a major and general degree college situated at Simen Chapari, Dhemaji district, Assam. This college is affiliated with the Dibrugarh University.

Departments

Arts
Assamese
English
History
Education
Economics
Philosophy
Political Science
Sociology
Bodo

References

External links

Universities and colleges in Assam
Colleges affiliated to Dibrugarh University
Educational institutions established in 1994
1994 establishments in Assam